Jarnioux is a former commune in the Rhône department in eastern France. On 1 January 2019, it was merged into the commune Porte des Pierres Dorées.

Places and monuments 
Jarnioux has several monuments :

 The manor of the Guard (private, rental of rooms for events).
 The castle of Jarnioux.
 The Sainte Catherine chapel.
 The viaduct of the old Beaujolais railway (Tacot).

Personalities linked to the municipality 
Auguste Guinon transformed Jarnioux from 1869. He equipped the village with a wash house, a town hall, a school and a church.

Serge Prisset, singer known for the song "Colombe ivre", released in 1970. He lives in Jarnioux.

See also
Communes of the Rhône department
Porte des Pierres Dorées

References

External links

Official site

Former communes of Rhône (department)
Lyonnais